Nafulsella is a genus from the family of Cesiribacteraceae with one known species (Nafulsella turpanensis).

References

Further reading 
 

Cytophagia
Bacteria genera
Monotypic bacteria genera